Erik Molnár (16 December 1894 – 8 August 1966) was a Hungarian communist politician, lawyer, economist and philosopher who served as Minister of Foreign Affairs twice: from 1947 to 1948 and from 1952 to 1953.

Biography
During the First World War he fought at the Eastern Front where captured by the Russians. As prisoner of war Molnár met with the communist ideas in a prisoner-of-war camp in Far East Asia. Later he returned to home and finished his legal studies. After that he joined to the illegal Hungarian Communist Party's working along with his younger brother, René. He published lot of articles for the illegal communist newspapers (Gondolat, Társadalmi Szemle, Korunk).

In the Interim National Government he served as Minister of Welfare (1944–1945). Later he was appointed Minister of Information and Minister of Foreign Affairs (1947–1948). Then he was the Hungarian ambassador to the Soviet Union (1948–1949), later he worked as Minister of Justice (1950–1952). He was Minister of Foreign Affairs again between 1952 and 1953. He was the President of the Supreme Court of Hungary between 1953 and 1954, later he was appointed as Minister of Justice again (1954–1956).

He was member of the assembly from 1944 until his death, and also member of the communist party's Central Committee. Molnár played a big role in the management of the history research as member of the Hungarian Academy of Sciences's history institute and as chairman of the Hungarian Historical Society. He dealt with the problems of the Hungarian social development thoroughly, first of all with the land question, the Marxism-Leninism applied his teachings to the Hungarian relations. During the Second World War bigger studies appeared about the Árpád era's society.  After 1945 Molnár dealt with the Hungarian prehistory and the feudalism with the questions of age social history, the ideological antecedents of the historical materialism and with his philosophical basis problems, the questions of the contemporary capitalism, dealt with the development of the nationalism and its development furthermore.

Publications
 Dialektika (Dialect), Budapest, 1941 (Erik Jeszenszky pseudonym).
 Magyar őstörténet (Hungarian prehistory), Budapest, 1942 (Lajos Szentmiklósy pseudonym).
 A feudalizmus kialakulása Magyarországon (The development of the feudalism in Hungary), Budapest, 1942 (Lajos Szentmiklósy pseudonym).
 Az Árpádkori társadalom 1. A gazdasági alap (The society of the Árpád Era I: The Economy), Budapest, 1943 (Lajos Szentmiklósy pseudonym).
 Az Árpádkori társadalom 2. A Felépítmény (The society of the Árpád Era II: The Forecastle), Budapest, 1943 (Lajos Szentmiklósy pseudonym).
 Dialektika (Dialect), Budapest, 1945.
 A magyar társadalom története az őskortól az Árpádkorig (The history of the Hungarian society from the Prehistory to the Árpád Era), Budapest, 1945.
 A magyar társadalom története az Árpádkortól Mohácsig (The history of the Hungarian society from the Árpád Era to the Battle of Mohács), Budapest, 1949.
 A történelmi materializmus ideológiai előzményei (The ideological antecedents of the historical materialism), Budapest, 1952.
 A magyar nép őstörténete (The prehistory of the Hungarian people), Budapest, 1953.
 A történelmi materializmus filozófiai alapproblémái (The philosophical basis problems of the historical materialism), Budapest, 1955.
 A jelenkori kapitalizmus néhány gazdasági problémája (Some economic problems of the contemporary capitalism), Budapest, 1959.
 Dialektikus materializmus és társadalomtudomány (Dialectic materialism and social science), Budapest, 1962.

References
 Magyar Életrajzi Lexikon

1894 births
1966 deaths
Politicians from Novi Sad
People from the Kingdom of Hungary
Hungarians in Vojvodina
Hungarian Communist Party politicians
Members of the Hungarian Working People's Party
Members of the Hungarian Socialist Workers' Party
Foreign ministers of Hungary
Justice ministers of Hungary
Members of the National Assembly of Hungary (1945–1947)
Members of the National Assembly of Hungary (1947–1949)
Members of the National Assembly of Hungary (1949–1953)
Members of the National Assembly of Hungary (1953–1958)
Members of the National Assembly of Hungary (1958–1963)
Members of the National Assembly of Hungary (1963–1967)
Ambassadors of Hungary to the Soviet Union
Hungarian Marxists
Hungarian philosophers
Hungarian economists
Hungarian jurists